Deuterated potassium dihydrogen phosphate (KD2PO4) or DKDP single crystals are widely used in non-linear optics as the second, third and fourth harmonic generators for Nd:YAG and Nd:YLF lasers. They are also found in electro-optical applications as Q-switches for Nd:YAG, Nd:YLF, Alexandrite and Ti-sapphire lasers, as well as for Pockels cells.

DKDP is closely related to monopotassium phosphate or KDP or KH2PO4. Replacement of hydrogen by deuterium in DKDP lowers the frequency of O-H vibrations and their overtones (high-order harmonics). Absorption of light by those overtones is detrimental for the infrared lasers, which DKDP and KDP crystals are used for. Consequently, despite higher cost, DKDP is more popular than KDP. 

DKDP crystals are grown by a water-solution method at usual level of deuteration >98%.

See also
Beta barium borate (BBO) – another popular non-linear crystal
Lithium triborate (LBO) – another popular non-linear crystal
Monopotassium phosphate (KDP) – another popular non-linear crystal
Non-linear optics
Potassium titanyl phosphate (KTP) – another popular non-linear crystal
Second harmonic generation (SHG)
Third harmonic generation (THG)
Two-photon absorption (TPA)
Organic nonlinear optical materials

References

Nonlinear optical materials
Phosphates
Potassium compounds
Deuterated compounds